Nauka (lit. trans.: Science) is a Russian publisher of academic books and journals. Established in the USSR in 1923, it was called the USSR Academy of Sciences Publishing House until 1963. Until 1934 the publisher was based in Leningrad, then moved to Moscow. Its logo depicts an open book with Sputnik 1 above it.

Nauka was the main scientific publisher of the USSR. Structurally it was a complex of publishing institutions, printing and book selling companies. It had two departments (in Leningrad and Novosibirsk) with separate printing works, two main editorial offices (for physical and mathematical literature and oriental literature) and more than 50 thematic editorial offices. Nauka's main book selling company Akademkniga ("Academic Book" in English) had some 30 trading centers in all major cities of the country.

Nauka was the main publisher of the USSR Academy of Sciences and its branches. The greater part of Nauka's production were monographs. It also published thematic collected works, reference books, textbooks and foreign literature in translation.

In 1972 Nauka published 135 scientific journals, including 31 physical and mathematical, 24 chemical, 29 biological and five popular science journals (Priroda (Nature), Zemlya i Vselennaya (Earth and the Universe), Khimia i zhizn (Chemistry and Life), Kvant (Quantum), and Russkaya rech (Russian speech).

Book series published by Nauka have included the Languages of Asia and Africa series.

The English distributor of the Nauka publications is MAIK Nauka/Interperiodica together with Pleiades Publishing and Springer Science+Business Media.

Nauka was the largest scientific publishing house in the USSR and in the world at one time (in 1982).

See also
 
 Nauka academic journals

References

External links
Official website
Official library

Book publishing companies of Russia
Publishing companies established in 1923
Academic publishing companies
Publishing companies of the Soviet Union
Science and technology in the Soviet Union
Companies based in Moscow